Marais des Cygnes Valley High School is a fully accredited public high school located in Melvern, Kansas, in the Marais des Cygnes Valley USD 456 school district, serving students in grades 6-12. Marais des Cygnes Valley has an enrollment of approximately 108 students. The principal is Ben Gordon. The school mascot is the Trojans and the school colors are orange and blue.

Extracurricular Activities
The Trojans compete in the Lyon County League. The KSHSAA classification switches between 2A and 1A, the two lowest classes according to KSHSAA. The school also has a variety of organizations for the students to participate in.

Athletics
The Trojans compete in the Lyon County League and are classified as either 2A or 1A, two of the lowest classifications in Kansas according to KSHSAA. A majority of the sports are coached by the same coaches. Marais des Cygnes Valley High School offers the following sports:

 Fall Sports
 Cheerleading
 Cross Country
 Football
 Volleyball

 Winter
 Boys' Basketball
 Girls' Basketball
 Cheerleading

 Spring
 Boys' Track and Field
 Girls' Track and Field
 Baseball
 Softball

Organizations
 Future Business Leaders of America
 Family, Careers, and Community Leaders of America (FCCLA)
 Future Farmers of America (FFA)
 National Honor Society
 Student Council StuCo)

See also
 List of high schools in Kansas
 List of unified school districts in Kansas

References

External links
School
 School Website
 District Website
Maps
 Melvern City Map, KDOT
 Osage County Map, KDOT

Public high schools in Kansas
Public middle schools in Kansas
Education in Osage County, Kansas